Lourenço Tomás Cuxixima (born 3 December 1981), commonly known as Loló, is an Angolan footballer who plays as a forward.

Loló appeared in one match for the Angola national team, in 2002.

National team statistics

References

External links

1982 births
Living people
Angolan footballers
Association football forwards
Angola international footballers